Mitt may refer to:

Gloves
Mitten, a garment covering the whole hand
Baseball mitt, a leather glove worn by baseball players on defense

Arts and media
Mitt (film), a 2014 documentary film about Mitt Romney
The Mitt, a bronze sculpture of a baseball mitt in T-Mobile Park, Seattle, Washington, United States

People
Mitt (name), a surname and given name
William Mitten (1819–1906), English authority on bryophytes and chemist, whose botanical author abbreviation is "Mitt."

Acronyms
MITT may refer to:
Moscow Institute of Thermal Technology
Military transition team (MiTT)
Modified intention-to-treat analysis, of a randomized controlled trial in medicine

See also
Mitts, a surname
MIT (disambiguation)